Pat Kelly may refer to:
Pat Kelly (American football) (1965–2003), former NFL tight end
Pat Kelly (Australian footballer) (1923–1999), Australian rules footballer
Pat Kelly (catcher) (born 1955), former Major League Baseball catcher
Pat Kelly (climber) (1873–1922), early female climber and founder of the Pinnacle Club
Pat Kelly (Gaelic footballer) (born 1981), Mayo and St Vincents footballer
Pat Kelly (infielder) (born 1967), former Major League Baseball infielder
Pat Kelly (musician) (1944–2019), reggae singer
Pat Kelly (outfielder) (1944–2005), American right fielder in Major League Baseball
Pat Kelly (politician) (born c. 1971), Canadian politician
Pat Kelly (speed skater) (born 1962), Canadian ice speed skater
Pat Kelly (trade unionist) (1929–2004), New Zealand trade unionist
Patrick J. Kelly (ice hockey) (born 1935), Canadian ice hockey player

See also
Patrick Kelly (disambiguation)